John Cresswell Walton (9 June 1888 – 2 December 1979) was an English first-class cricketer.

Walton was born at Greenwich in October 1896. A police officer, Walton served in the Royal Ulster Constabulary. He played his club cricket for North of Ireland, and first represented Ireland in a minor match against the Marylebone Cricket Club at Belfast in 1924; the previous season, he had represented the Northern Cricket Union in a minor match against the touring West Indians. He made a single appearance in first-class cricket for Ireland against Wales at Llandudno during Ireland's 1925 tour of England and Wales. Opening the batting, Walton scored 48 runs in Ireland's first-innings, before being dismissed by Frank Ryan, while in their second-innings he was dismissed for 4 runs by Jack Mercer. He did not feature for Ireland after this match. He returned to England around the mid-1920s, as he no longer features in club scorecards in Ireland after this period. He died at Bromley in the third quarter of 1970.

Notes

References

External links

1888 births
1970 deaths
People from Greenwich
British police officers
Royal Ulster Constabulary officers
English cricketers
Ireland cricketers